The Co-Cathedral of Cáceres is a Roman Catholic church in the town of Cáceres, region of Extremadura, Spain.

The cathedral was erected in the 15th century in a Gothic style, with the main portal following the Romanesque architectural tradition. The main 16th-century retablo, dedicated to the Assumption of the Virgin, was carved by Roque Balduque and Guillen Ferrant. The interior has notable artworks and sculptures, including a San Pedro de Alcantara by Enrique Pérez Comendador.

This church was granted the status of co-cathedral in 1957; it shares Coria's diocese.

References

15th-century Roman Catholic church buildings in Spain
Romanesque architecture in Extremadura
Gothic architecture in Extremadura
Roman Catholic cathedrals in Extremadura
Churches in Extremadura
Buildings and structures in Cáceres, Spain